Eeva Karin Kilpi (née Salo; 18 February 1928, Hiitola) is a Finnish writer and feminist. Better known abroad than in Finland, her poetry, characterized as feminist humor, was discovered in the 1980s in Europe.

Biography 
Eeva Karin Salo was born on February 18, 1928, to Solmu Aulis Aimo and Helmi Anna Maria (née Saharinen) Salo within the former Karelian municipality of Hiitola, Finnish Karelia, where she lived until the coming of the Winter War of 1939-1940.

During the Winter War, Kilpi and her family survived bombings by hiding in an underground cellar. Her father was later called away to the front lines and the family was forced to evacuate from the region. Kilpi ended up attaining an education in Helsinki, the capital and largest city in Finland.

Awards
State book awards (1968, 1974, 1984)
Espoo Medal (1977)
Pro Finlandia Medal (1974)
Runeberg Prize (1990)
Alfred Kordelin the general progress and education fund account Prize (1999)
Karelia Award (2001)
Thanks for the Book Award (2002)
Nils Ferlin-priset (2007)
Karelian Association Pro Karelia Badge

Selected works

Short story collections 

 Noidanlukko WSOY 1959
 Lapikkaita, WSOY 1966
 Rakkauden ja kuoleman pöytä, WSOY 1967
 Kesä ja keski-ikäinen nainen, WSOY 1970
 Hyvän yön tarinoita, WSOY 1971
 Se mitä ei koskaan sanota, WSOY 1979
 Kuolema ja nuori rakastaja, WSOY 1986
 Kootut novellit vuosilta 1959–1986, WSOY 1987

Novels 

 Kukkivan maan rannat, WSOY 1960
 Nainen kuvastimessa, WSOY 1962
 Elämä edestakaisin, WSOY 1964
 Tamara, WSOY 1972
 Häätanhu, WSOY 1973
 Naisen päiväkirja, WSOY 1978
 Elämän evakkona, WSOY 1983
 Unta vain, WSOY 2007

Books 

 Talvisodan aika, WSOY 1989
 Välirauha, ikävöinnin aika, WSOY 1990
 Jatkosodan aika, WSOY 1993
 Muistojen aika. Yhteisnide kolmesta edellisestä kirjasta, WSOY 1998
 Rajattomuuden aika, WSOY 2001

Poetry collections 

 Laulu rakkaudesta ja muita runoja, WSOY 1972
 Terveisin, WSOY 1976
 Runoja 1972–1976, WSOY 1978
 Ennen kuolemaa, WSOY 1982
 Animalia, WSOY 1987
 Laulu rakkaudesta, Eeva Kilven runot, Ellen Thesleffin kuvat, WSOY 1991
 Kiitos eilisestä, WSOY 1996
 Laulu rakkaudesta. Kiitos eilisestä, 2000
 Perhonen ylittää tien. Kootut runot 1972–2000, WSOY 2000
 Kuolinsiivous, WSOY 2012

Essay collections 
 Ihmisen ääni, WSOY 1976

See also
Fire and Ice: The Winter War of Finland and Russia

References

External links

Fire and Ice, documentary of Finland's Winter War and Continuation war, including Eeva Kilpi as a witness

1928 births
Living people
People from Lakhdenpokhsky District
20th-century Finnish poets
Finnish feminists
21st-century Finnish poets
Finnish women poets
20th-century Finnish women writers
21st-century Finnish women writers